The Airport Operators Association (AOA) is the trade association representing the interests of UK airports and the principal body engaged with the UK Government and regulatory authorities on airport matters. Its mission is to see UK airports grow sustainably. The AOA represents some 50+ UK airports and general aviation airfields in the UK.

History
The AOA was formed in 1934 as the Aerodrome Owners' Association. On 17 April 1990 it became the Airport Operators Association.

Structure
It represents 50+ airports and around 160 companies and organisations which do not own airports but operate in the aviation industry.

Function
The AOA is the organisation which speaks on behalf of UK airports. It engages with the UK Government, parliamentarians and regulatory authorities to secure policy outcomes that support sustainable growth in the aviation sector. Policy and campaigning remain at the heart of how it promotes the UK airports sector and communicates its message to political and public audiences.

It engages effectively  with key decision makers, and makes a positive case that the airports sector is vital for promoting jobs, growth and economic sustainability for UK plc. It calls for pro-aviation policies, such as an end to increases in Air Passenger Duty (APD), and a planning and regulatory regime which supports both a network of vibrant point-to-point airports and world-class hub capacity.

It is an active member of the A Fair Tax on Flying campaign, a coalition of more than 30 leading travel and aviation organisations, including airlines, airports, trade associations and destinations who believe that APD is too high and is particularly damaging to jobs, growth and the UK's connectivity with the world.

The AOA is also a member of Sustainable Aviation, a coalition of the UK's airports, airlines, aircraft and engine manufacturers, and air traffic management providers, launched in 2005 to allow the industry to come together to tackle the challenges of delivering a sustainable future for aviation: for example, dealing with carbon emissions, noise and local impacts around airports.

Its trade journal is called the "Airport Operator" and is published three times a year. The AOA organises a number of events throughout the year, including an annual dinner, the principal aviation dinner in Europe; an Annual Conference; a summer reception and conferences on the environment; security and operations & safety.

It sponsors UK Airports Safety Week each year.

References

External links
 AOA
 A Fair Tax on Flying
 Sustainable Aviation

Aviation organisations based in the United Kingdom
Organisations based in the City of Westminster
Organizations established in 1934
Airports in the United Kingdom
Airport operators